Brasil de Fato is a Brazilian online newspaper and a radio agency, in addition to having regional newspapers in Rio de Janeiro, Minas Gerais, São Paulo, Paraná and Pernambuco.

Launched on January 25, 2003, on the World Social Forum of 2003 in Porto Alegre by social movement organizations like the Landless Workers' Movement, Via Campesina, and Pastoral Care Social Commission, it circulated for more than ten years with a national weekly print version. It was founded by Alípio Freire.

The newspaper, of national circulation, gathers left-wing journalists, writers, commentators, and other national and international intellectuals, who joined to form Brasil de Fato after they realized the need to a democratization of the press. It intends the debate of ideas and the analysis of facts from the standpoint of the need for social change in the country.

References

External links
Official website

2003 establishments in Brazil
Mass media in São Paulo
Weekly newspapers published in Brazil
Portuguese-language newspapers
Publications established in 2003